State Route 662 is a secondary state highway in the U.S. state of Virginia, and traverses western Fairfax County.

Route description 

SR 662 uses three different names: Stone Road, Poplar Tree Road, and Westfields Boulevard.

Stone Road
The southern terminus of SR 662 is just south of an intersection with US 29 (Lee Highway), just west of Interstate 66.  Stone Road is a four-lane highway, mostly divided by a relatively narrow median.

Stone Road passes through the "London Towne" section of Centreville, and past a shopping center as it approaches Braddock Road.

Poplar Tree Road
North of Braddock Road, SR 662 becomes Poplar Tree Road. This road curves around housing developments to the front of the Sully Station shopping center, where the name changes to Westfields Boulevard. Poplar Tree Road had been a two-lane undivided road but in spring 2013 a reconstruction and widening project was completed, and it is now a four-lane divided road.

Westfields Boulevard
SR 662 continues past the Sully Station shopping center and through an interchange with SR 28 (Sully Road), then past office parks before ending at SR 657 (Walney Road).  Approaching this T intersection northbound on SR 662, traffic for southbound SR 657 turns right while northbound SR 657 continues straight. Westfields Boulevard is a four to six lane divided highway.

History
Prior to 1990, SR 662 followed Poplar Tree Road across VA 28 and the southern section of Chantilly.  The completion of the widening of Route 28 (plus the construction of the north end of Sully Station shopping center) made Poplar Tree Road discontinuous, separating its Centreville and Chantilly sections.  Westfields Boulevard had been built in the late 1980s, but the SR 662 designation was not officially moved onto it until nearly twenty years later.  The Chantilly segment of Poplar Tree Road was renumbered in the late 2000s.

Major intersections

References

662 Fairfax
State Route 662
State Route 662